Isochaetides is a genus of annelids belonging to the family Naididae.

The species of this genus are found in Eurasia and America.

Species:
 Isochaetides adenodicystis Semernoy, 1982 
 Isochaetides arenarius (Michaelsen, 1926)

References

Naididae